The Alakool dam is a dam in Saudi Arabia opened in 1979 and located in Madinah region.

See also 

 List of dams in Saudi Arabia

References 

Dams in Saudi Arabia